George Woltman (born November 10, 1957) is the founder of the Great Internet Mersenne Prime Search (GIMPS), a distributed computing project researching Mersenne prime numbers using his software Prime95. He graduated from the Massachusetts Institute of Technology (MIT) with a degree in computer science. He lives in North Carolina. His mathematical libraries created for the GIMPS project are the fastest known for multiplication of large integers, and are used by other distributed computing projects as well, such as Seventeen or Bust.

He also worked on a TTL version of Maze War while a student at MIT.  Later he worked as a programmer for Data General.

See also 
 Prime95

References

External links 
 The Prime Pages Titan Biography
 GIMPS home page

1957 births
Living people
Great Internet Mersenne Prime Search
20th-century American mathematicians
21st-century American mathematicians
MIT School of Engineering alumni